The following is a list of notable deaths in October 2002.

Entries for each day are listed alphabetically by surname. A typical entry lists information in the following sequence:
 Name, age, country of citizenship at birth, subsequent country of citizenship (if applicable), reason for notability, cause of death (if known), and reference.

October 2002

1
Walter Annenberg, 94, American publisher (The Philadelphia Inquirer, TV Guide, Daily Racing Form, Seventeen) and philanthropist.
Ilie Ceaușescu, 76, Romanian general and communist politician.
Consuelo Salgar de Montejo, 74, Colombian journalist, advertising executive, and politician, liver cancer.
Ted Serong, 86, Australian soldier.

2
Ted Blackman, 60, Canadian media personality in Montreal, Quebec.
Norman O. Brown, 89, American philosopher and author (Life Against Death, Love's Body).
Heinz von Foerster, 90, Austrian-American physicist and philosopher, one of the founders of constructivism.
Paul Sérant, 80, French journalist and writer.
R. A. Simpson, 73, Australian poet, artist and art lecturer.
Alexander Sinclair, 91, Canadian ice hockey player.

3
Cliff Durandt, 62, South African football player, heart attack.
John Erritt, 71, British civil servant.
Bruce Paltrow, 58, American television and film director and producer, complications from oral cancer and pneumonia.
Dalvanius Prime, 54, New Zealand entertainer and songwriter, cancer.
John Weitz, 79, American fashion designer, novelist and historian.

4
Alphonse Chapanis, 85, American pioneer in the field of industrial design.
André Delvaux, 76, Belgian film director, considered the father of the Belgian film industry.
Fram Farrington, 94, Northern Irish scientific officer, member of a secret World War II Antarctic expeditionary force.
Barbara Fawkes, 87, British nurse, Chief Education Officer for the General Nursing Council for England and Wales.
Ahmad Mahmoud, 70, Iranian novelist.
Roy Wilkins, 68, American professional football player (University of Georgia, Los Angeles Rams, Washington Redskins).

5
Sir Reginald Hibbert, 80, British diplomat.
Morag Hood, 59, British actress, cancer.
Tony Mazzocchi, 76, American labor leader.
Laurence Schache, 34, Australian rules footballer, amyloidosis.
Jay R. Smith, 87, American child actor and comedian, stabbed.
Victor Zagainov, 49, Kazakhstani balloonist and astronomer, balloon collision.

6
Frank Barron, 80, American psychologist and author, considered a pioneer in the psychology of the creative mind.
Claus von Amsberg, 76, husband of Queen Beatrix of the Netherlands and Dutch diplomat.
Ben Eastman, 91, American runner (silver medal in men's 400 metres at the 1932 Summer Olympics).
Chuck Rayner, 82, Canadian professional hockey player (New York Americans, New York Rangers).
Nick Whitehead, 69, British (Welsh) sprinter (bronze medal in men's 4 × 100 metres relay at the 1960 Summer Olympics).

7
Pierangelo Bertoli, 59, Italian singer-songwriter and poet, heart attack.
Oran K. Gragson, 91, American businessman and longest-serving mayor of Las Vegas.
Ralph Harry, 85, Australian diplomat and intelligence specialist.
Marcel Paille, 69, Canadian  ice hockey goaltender, cancer.
Ed Rossbach, 88, American fiber artist

8
Jodie Beeler, 80, American baseball player (Cincinnati Reds).
Phyllis Calvert, 87, British actress (The Man in Grey, Fanny by Gaslight, The Magic Bow, My Own True Love).
Lucille Caudill Little, 93, American patron of the arts and philanthropist.
Jacques Richard, 50, Canadian ice hockey player, car accident.
Joachim Zahn, 88, German business executive, a senior executive at Daimler-Benz from 1958 to 1980.

9
Charles Guggenheim, 78, American documentary film director, producer, and screenwriter.
Anwar Hussain, 82, Pakistani cricketer.
Oleksandr Liashko, 86, Ukrainian politician.
Eric Martin, 33, American racing driver, racing accident.
Jim Martin, 78, American football player.
Aileen Wuornos, 46, American serial killer, execution by lethal injection.
Terry Yurkiewicz, 59, Canadian ice hockey goaltender.

10
Allison Calder, 42, New Zealand Olympic swimmer (women's 400 metre freestyle, women's 800 metre freestyle at the 1976 Summer Olympics).
Tom Casey, 78, American professional football player (New York Yankees, Hamilton Wildcats, Winnipeg Blue Bombers).
Fate Echols, 63, American professional football player (Northwestern University, St. Louis Cardinals).
Lawrence H. Fountain, 89, American politician (U.S. Representative for North Carolina's 2nd congressional district).
Teresa Graves, 54, American actress and singer, house fire.
Denison Kitchel, 94, American lawyer political advisor.
Zara Nelsova, 81, Canadian cellist.
Erling Sørensen, 81, Danish football player and manager.
Lady Marguerite Tangye, 89, British debutante, model, and actress.
Joe Wood, 86, American baseball player (Boston Red Sox).

11
Shaden Abu-Hijleh, 61, Palestinian peace activist.
Sir Stewart Crawford, 89, British diplomat.
Paul Crump, 72, American death row inmate and author (Burn, Killer, Burn).
William J. Field, 93, British politician.
Ron Gray, 82, English football player and manager.
Betty Molesworth Allen, 89, New Zealand botanist.
Dina Pathak, 80, Indian actor and director, heart attack.
Stanley Wagner, 94, Canadian ice hockey player (gold medal in ice hockey at the 1932 Winter Olympics).
Rusty Wailes, 66, American rower (two Olympic gold medals in rowing: 1956 men's eight, 1960 men's coxless four).

12
Viktor Asmaev, 54, Russian Olympic equestrian (gold medal winner in equestrian team jumping at the 1980 Summer Olympics).
Thomas J. Cahill, 92, American chief of police of San Francisco, California from 1958 to 1970.
Ray Conniff, 85, American bandleader and arranger (The Ray Conniff Singers), made more than 100 recordings and produced 25 Top-40 albums.
Sir Desmond Fitzpatrick, 89, British general.
Audrey Mestre, 28, French world record-setting free diver.
Nozomi Momoi, 24, Japanese AV idol, murdered.
Sidney W. Pink, 86, American movie director and producer.
Mick Shoebottom, 57, English rugby league player.

13
Stephen Ambrose, 66, American historian and author (Band of Brothers).
Keene Curtis, 79, American actor (The Rothschilds, Annie, Cheers).
Jim Higgins, 71, British politician.
Dennis Patrick, 84, American actor, fire.
Eileen Southern, 82, American musicologist, researcher and author.
Garfield Todd, 94, Prime Minister of Southern Rhodesia.

14
Jim Brakefield, 83, American college football and baseball coach (Wofford College, Appalachian State University).
Irving Davies, 76, Welsh dancer and choreographer (Value for Money, Kiss Me Kate, The Benny Hill Show).
Elisabeth Furse, 92, German-British Communist activist and World War II resistance worker.
Oluf Reed-Olsen, 84, Norwegian pilot.
S. William Green, 72, American politician (U.S. Representative for New York's 18th and 15th congressional districts).
Norbert Schultze, 91, German film score composer and Nazi Party member.
Arturo Silvestri, 81, Italian football player and manager.
Harriet Werley, 88, American nurse and nurse researcher, a pioneer in nursing informatics.

15
Grace Hamblin, 94, British private secretary to Winston Churchill and Lady Clementine Churchill.
Jack Lee, 89, British film director.
Ze'ev, 79, Israeli caricaturist and illustrator.

16
Per Bak, 53, Danish theoretical physicist, known for "self-organized criticality", myelodysplastic syndrome.
Philip Brett, 64, British-born American musicologist, musician and conductor, cancer.
James Disbrow, 54, American figure skater, co-founder of Buffalo Wild Wings, and president of the United States Figure Skating Association, brain cancer.
Harry Ferrier, 82, Scottish football player and manager.
Haytham Kajjo, 26, Syrian football player, car accident.
William Macmillan, 75, Scottish minister.

17
Bashful Brother Oswald, 90, American country musician, a frequent Grand Ole Opry performer.
Derek Bell, 66, Northern Irish harpist, pianist, oboist, musicologist and composer (The Chieftains), cardiac arrest.
Pattie Coldwell, 50, British television broadcaster and journalist (Nationwide, Open Air, Loose Women, You and Yours).
Yara Cortes, 81, Brazilian actress.
Zekerijah Đezić, 64, Bosnian folk singer.
Jeanne L. Noble, 76, African-American educator, congestive heart failure.
Yitzhak Peretz, 66, Israeli politician.
Alina Pienkowska, 50, Polish free trade union activist and politician, cancer.
Henri Renaud, 67, French jazz pianist and record company executive.
Aileen Riggin, 96, American swimmer and diver.
Catherine Uhlmyer, 109, longest-living survivor of the General Slocum fire of June 15, 1904.

18
Richard Bernstein, 62, American artist, member of the circle of Andy Warhol, complications of AIDS.
Sir Cecil Blacker, 86, British army general, Adjutant-General to the Forces.
Kam Fong Chun, 84, American police officer and actor (Hawaii Five-O).
John D. Ferry, 90, Canadian-American biochemist, made important contributions to polymer science.
Roman Tam, 52, Hong Kong canto-pop singer.

19
Manuel Álvarez Bravo, 100, Mexican photographer.
Peter Bergmann, 87, German-American physicist, known for his work with Albert Einstein on a unified field theory.
Maitland B. Bleecker, 99, American inventor and author.
Mehli Mehta, 94, Indian conductor and violinist.
Hank Smith, 68, Canadian country music singer.

20
Barbara Berjer, 82, American actress (As the World Turns, Another World).
Les Douglas, 83, Canadian professional ice hockey player (Detroit Red Wings).
Bernard Fresson, 71, French actor (French Connection II, The Tenant, Street of No Return).
Mel Harder, 93, American baseball player (Cleveland Indians), coach and manager (Cleveland Indians).
Bernhard Neumann, 93, British-Australian mathematician.
Nolan White, 71, American land speed record race car driver.

21
Sir Roger Cork, 55, British accountant and Lord Mayor of London.
Manfred Ewald, 76, East German Olympic committee president, convicted for his role in the use of PEDs by East German athletes.
Anna King, 64, American soul and gospel singer.
Marquita Rivera, 80, Puerto Rican actress, singer and dancer, stroke.
Beatrice Serota, Baroness Serota, 83, British politician.
Eileen Simpson, American writer and psychotherapist.
Harbhajan Singh, 82, Punjabi poet, critic, cultural commentator, and translator.
Y. R. Swamy, Indian film director and screenwriter.

22
Marian Bergeron, 84, American beauty pageant winner (Miss America 1933) and big band singer (Rudy Vallée, Tommy Dorsey, Guy Lombardo).
Geraldine of Albania, 87, Queen consort of King Zog I of Albania.
Igor Irodov, 78, Soviet Russian physicist and World War II veteran.
Nonoy Marcelo, 63, Filipino cartoonist, complications from diabetes.
Robert Nixon, 63, British cartoonist.
Ibu Kasur, 76, Indonesian child educator, children songwriter.

23
Lucille Carroll, 96, American Broadway actress and MGM studio executive.
Adolph Green, 87, American lyricist and playwright.
Richard Helms, 89, American former CIA director.
David Lewis, 85, New Zealand sailor and adventurer.
Elizabeth Pakenham, Countess of Longford, 96, British historian.

24
Bill Jenkins, 77, Royal Marines officer and academic.
Winton M. Blount, 81, American public servant (United States Postmaster General), business executive and philanthropist.
Hernando Casanova, 57, Colombian actor, director, singer, and presenter, heart attack.
Harry Hay, 90, American gay rights activist and Mattachine Society founder.
Charmian May, 65, English actress (You're Only Young Twice, Weirdsister College, Bridget Jones's Diary).
Peggy Moran, 84, American film actress, complications from a car accident.
Scott Plank, 43, American actor.
Lotte Tarp, 57, Danish actress.

25
Ian Russell, 13th Duke of Bedford, 85, British peer and writer.
Richard Harris, 72, Irish actor (Camelot, Harry Potter and the Philosopher's Stone, This Sporting Life).
René Thom, 79, French mathematician.
Ruth B. Weg, 82, American professor of gerontology.
Lloyd F. Weeks, 70, American politician.
Paul Wellstone, 58, American professor, author and politician (U.S. Senator from Minnesota).

26
Movsar Barayev, 23, Chechen Islamist militia leader, killed during the Moscow theater hostage crisis.
Zura Barayeva, Chechen Islamist, killed during the Moscow theater hostage crisis.
Jacques Massu, 94, French general.
George Serdula, 82, American football player, coach, and university professor.
Sally Hoyt Spofford, 88, American ornithologist.
William A. Zeck, 87, American New York State judge and prosecutor at the Nuremberg war-crimes trials.

27
Andre DeToth, 89, Hungarian-American film director (The Gunfighter, House of Wax, The Indian Fighter), aneurysm.
Tom Dowd, 77, American recording engineer and producer, a pioneer in stereo and multitrack tape recording, emphysema.
Edor Hjukström, 86, Swedish military officer and Olympic skier.
Baby Lloyd Stallworth, 61, American singer, dancer, songwriter, musician, choreographer, and recording artist, complications of diabetes.
Charles Orville Whitley, 75, American politician (U.S. Representative for North Carolina's 3rd congressional district).

28
Joan Archibald, 89, Canadian Olympic fencer (women's foil at the 1932 Summer Olympics).
Margaret Booth, 104, American film editor (Mutiny on the Bounty, The Way We Were, Annie).
Morris Curotta, 73, Australian Olympic sprinter (1948 Summer Olympics, 1952 Summer Olympics).
Lawrence Dobkin, 83, American television director and character actor (The Ten Commandments, The Defiant Ones, North by Northwest, Patton).
Laurence Foley, 60, American diplomat and employee of U.S. Agency for International Development (USAID).
Erling Persson, 85, Swedish businessman, founder of H&M.
Sir Patrick Russell, 76, British jurist.

29
Muriel Bevis, 74, American professional baseball player (All-American Girls Professional Baseball League).
Marion Carpenter, 82, American press photographer, one of the first women White House photographers, covered President Harry Truman.
Chang-Lin Tien, 67, Chinese-American educator, 7th Chancellor of the University of California, Berkeley.
Richard Jenkin, 77, Cornish nationalist politician.
Glenn McQueen, 41, Canadian animator (Toy Story, Monsters, Inc., A Bug's Life).
Julian Webb, 91, American lawyer, politician and judge (Georgia Court of Appeals).

30
Pierre Aigrain, 78, French physicist.
Alfred Atherton, 80, American Foreign Service Officer and diplomat, served as United States Ambassador to Egypt from 1979 to 1983.
Aliki Diplarakou, 90, Greek beauty pageant winner, first Greek contestant to win Miss Europe title.
Jam Master Jay, 37, American musician (Run DMC), shot.
Sir William Mitchell, 77, British physicist.
Raymond Savignac, 94, French graphic designer.

31
Yuri Ahronovitch, 70, Russian conductor.
Moose Cholak, 72, American professional wrestler.
Sir Napier Crookenden, 87, British Army general.
Jean-Marie Fortier, 82, Canadian Roman Catholic prelate.
Baroness Hylton-Foster, 94, British peer.
Raf Vallone, 86, Italian actor (A View from the Bridge, Bitter Rice, The Godfather Part III) and journalist.
Eckart Wagner, 64, German Olympic sailor (1960 Star sailing, 1964 5.5 metre sailing, 1968 Star sailing).

References 

2002-10
 10